Mangudi  is a village in the Aranthangirevenue block of Pudukkottai district, Tamil Nadu, India.

Demographics 

As of the 2001 census, Mangudi had a total population of  
1522 with 750 males and 772 females. Out of the total population, 957 people were literate.

References

Villages in Pudukkottai district